Magnus Decentius (died 18 August 353) was caesar of the Western Roman Empire from 350 to 353, under his brother Magnentius.

History 
Nothing is known of Decentius prior to 350. Magnentius usurped power from Constans on 18 January 350, and elevated Decentius as caesar later that year, perhaps on July or August. He was appointed consul in 352. In the following year, after he had lost the battle of Mursa Major, Magnentius' exactions to finance the war drove Gaul into revolt against his dictatorial rule, and Decentius was expelled from the capital, Treves, which headed the revolt.

Constantius II, emperor of the East, had meantime incited the Alamanni to invade the province in order to increase the pressure on the usurper. Decentius, who led his brother's forces in the north, was defeated in a pitched battle by the Alemannic chief Chnodomar, and besieged in Sens. There news reached him of Constantius' victory at the Battle of Mons Seleucus, and the subsequent suicide of Magnentius. Decentius strangled himself, signalling the end of the civil war.

References

 Ammianus Marcellinus, Res Gestae, XVI
 Edward Gibbon [1789] (1932) The History of the Decline and Fall of the Roman Empire. The Modern Library.

External links

Ancient Roman military personnel who committed suicide
4th-century Roman usurpers
Suicides by hanging in France
Imperial Roman consuls
353 deaths
Year of birth unknown
Flavii